

Events

Pre-1600
49 BC – Julius Caesar crosses the Rubicon, signalling the start of civil war.
9 – The Western Han dynasty ends when Wang Mang claims that the divine Mandate of Heaven called for the end of the dynasty and the beginning of his own, the Xin dynasty.
69 – Lucius Calpurnius Piso Licinianus is appointed by Galba as deputy Roman Emperor.
 236 – Pope Fabian succeeds Anterus to become the twentieth pope of Rome.
1072 – Robert Guiscard conquers Palermo in Sicily for the Normans.
1430 – Philip the Good, the Duke of Burgundy, establishes the Order of the Golden Fleece, the most prestigious, exclusive, and expensive order of chivalry in the world.
1475 – Stephen III of Moldavia defeats the Ottoman Empire at the Battle of Vaslui.

1601–1900
1645 – Archbishop William Laud is beheaded for treason at the Tower of London.
1776 – American Revolution: Thomas Paine publishes his pamphlet Common Sense.
1791 – The Siege of Dunlap's Station begins near Cincinnati during the Northwest Indian War.
1812 – The first steamboat on the Ohio River or the Mississippi River arrives in New Orleans, 82 days after departing from Pittsburgh.
1861 – American Civil War: Florida becomes the third state to secede from the Union.
1863 – The Metropolitan Railway, the world's oldest underground railway, opens between Paddington and Farringdon, marking the beginning of the London Underground.
1870 – John D. Rockefeller incorporates Standard Oil.

1901–present
1901 – The first great Texas oil gusher is discovered at Spindletop in Beaumont, Texas.
1901 – New York: Automobile Club of America installs signs on major highways. 
1916 – World War I: Imperial Russia begins the Erzurum Offensive, leading to the defeat of the Ottoman Empire Third Army.
 1917 – Imperial Trans-Antarctic Expedition: Seven survivors of the Ross Sea party were rescued after being stranded for several months.
1920 – The Treaty of Versailles takes effect, officially ending World War I for all combatant nations except the United States.
  1920   – League of Nations Covenant automatically enters into force after the Treaty of Versailles is ratified by Germany.
1927 – Fritz Lang's futuristic film Metropolis is released in Germany.
1941 – World War II: The Greek army captures Kleisoura.
1946 – The first General Assembly of the United Nations assembles in the Methodist Central Hall, Westminster. Fifty-one nations are represented.
  1946   – The United States Army Signal Corps successfully conducts Project Diana, bouncing radio waves off the Moon and receiving the reflected signals.
1954 – BOAC Flight 781, a de Havilland DH.106 Comet 1, explodes and falls into the Tyrrhenian Sea, killing 35 people.
1966 – Tashkent Declaration, a peace agreement between India and Pakistan signed that resolved the Indo-Pakistani War of 1965.
1972 – Sheikh Mujibur Rahman returns to the newly independent Bangladesh as president after spending over nine months in prison in Pakistan.
1980 – The New England Journal of Medicine publishes the letter Addiction Rare in Patients Treated with Narcotics, which is later misused to downplay the general risk of addiction to opioids.
1981 – Salvadoran Civil War: The FMLN launches its first major offensive, gaining control of most of Morazán and Chalatenango departments
1984 – Holy See–United States relations: The United States and Holy See (Vatican City) re-establish full diplomatic relations after almost 117 years, overturning the United States Congress's 1867 ban on public funding for such a diplomatic envoy.
1985 – Sandinista Daniel Ortega becomes president of Nicaragua and vows to continue the transformation to socialism and alliance with the Soviet Union and Cuba; American policy continues to support the Contras in their revolt against the Nicaraguan government.
1990 – Time Warner is formed by the merger of Time Inc. and Warner Communications.
2000 – Crossair Flight 498, a Saab 340 aircraft, crashes in Niederhasli, Switzerland, after taking off from Zurich Airport, killing 13 people.
2007 – A general strike begins in Guinea in an attempt to get President Lansana Conté to resign.
2012 – A bombing at Jamrud in Pakistan, kills at least 30 people and injures 78 others.
2013 – More than 100 people are killed and 270 injured in several bomb blasts in the Quetta area of Pakistan.
2015 – A traffic accident between an oil tanker truck and passenger coach en route to Shikarpur from Karachi on the Pakistan National Highway Link Road near Gulshan-e-Hadeed, Karachi, killing at least 62 people.
2019 – A 13-year-old American girl, Jayme Closs, is found alive in Gordon, Wisconsin, having been kidnapped 88 days earlier from her parents' home whilst they were murdered.

Births

Pre-1600
 626 – Husayn ibn Ali the third Shia Imam (d. 680)
1480 – Margaret of Austria, Duchess of Savoy (d. 1530)
1538 – Louis of Nassau (d. 1574)

1601–1900
1607 – Isaac Jogues, French priest and missionary (d. 1646)
1644 – Louis François, duc de Boufflers, French general (d. 1711)
1654 – Joshua Barnes, English historian and scholar (d. 1712)
1702 – Johannes Zick, German painter (d. 1762)
1715 – Christian August Crusius, German philosopher and theologian (d. 1775)
1750 – Thomas Erskine, 1st Baron Erskine, Scottish-English lawyer and politician, Lord Chancellor of Great Britain (d. 1823)
1760 – Johann Rudolf Zumsteeg, German composer and conductor (d. 1802)
1769 – Michel Ney, French general (d. 1815)
1776 – George Birkbeck, English physician and academic, founded Birkbeck, University of London (d. 1841)
1780 – Martin Lichtenstein, German physician and explorer (d. 1857)
1802 – Carl Ritter von Ghega, Italian-Austrian engineer, designed the Semmering railway (d. 1860)
1810 – Ferdinand Barbedienne, French engineer (d. 1892)
  1810   – Jeremiah S. Black, American jurist and politician, 23rd United States Secretary of State (d. 1883)
  1810   – William Haines, English-Australian politician, 1st Premier of Victoria (d. 1866)
1823 – Haji Zeynalabdin Taghiyev, Azerbaijani national industrial magnate and philanthropist (d. 1924)
1827 – Amanda Cajander, Finnish medical reformer (d. 1871)
1828 – Herman Koeckemann, German bishop and missionary (d. 1892)
1829 – Epameinondas Deligeorgis, Greek lawyer, journalist and politician, Prime Minister of Greece (d. 1879)
1834 – John Dalberg-Acton, 1st Baron Acton, Italian-English historian and politician (d. 1902)
1840 – Louis-Nazaire Bégin, Canadian cardinal (d. 1925)
1842 – Luigi Pigorini, Italian paleontologist, archaeologist, and ethnographer (d. 1925)
1843 – Frank James, American soldier and criminal (d. 1915)
1848 – Reinhold Sadler, American merchant and politician, 9th Governor of Nevada (d. 1906)
1849 – Robert Crosbie, Canadian theosophist, founded the United Lodge of Theosophists (d. 1919)
1850 – John Wellborn Root, American architect, designed the Rookery Building and Monadnock Building (d. 1891)
1854 – Ramón Corral, Mexican general and politician, 6th Vice President of Mexico (d. 1912)
1858 – Heinrich Zille, German illustrator and photographer (d. 1929)
1859 – Francesc Ferrer i Guàrdia, Spanish philosopher and academic (d. 1909)
1860 – Charles G. D. Roberts, Canadian poet and author (d. 1943)
1864 – Grand Duke Peter Nikolaevich of Russia (d. 1931)
1873 – Algernon Maudslay, English sailor (d. 1948)
  1873   – Jack O'Neill, Irish-American baseball player (d. 1935)
  1873   – George Orton, Canadian runner and hurdler (d. 1958)
1875 – Issai Schur, German mathematician and academic (d. 1941)
1877 – Frederick Gardner Cottrell, American physical chemist, inventor and philanthropist (d. 1948)
1878 – John McLean, American hurdler, football player, and coach (d. 1955)
1880 – Manuel Azaña, Spanish jurist and politician, 7th President of Spain (d. 1940)
1883 – Francis X. Bushman, American actor, director, and screenwriter (d. 1966)
  1883   – Aleksey Nikolayevich Tolstoy, Russian journalist, author, and poet (d. 1945)
1887 – Robinson Jeffers, American poet and philosopher (d. 1962)
1890 – Pina Menichelli, Italian actress (d. 1984)
1891 – Heinrich Behmann, German mathematician and academic (d. 1970)
  1891   – Ann Shoemaker, American actress (d. 1978)
1892 – Dumas Malone, American historian and author (d. 1986)
  1892   – Melchior Wańkowicz, Polish soldier, journalist, and author (d. 1974)
1893 – Albert Jacka, Australian captain, Victoria Cross recipient (d. 1932)
1894 – Pingali Lakshmikantam, Indian poet and author (d. 1972)
1895 – Percy Cerutty, Australian athletics coach (d. 1975)
1896 – Yong Mun Sen, Malaysian watercolour painter (d. 1962)
  1896   – Dinkar G. Kelkar, Indian art collector (d. 1990)
1898 – Katharine Burr Blodgett, American physicist and engineer (d. 1979)
1900 – Violette Cordery, English racing driver (d. 1983)

1901–present
1903 – Barbara Hepworth, English sculptor (d. 1975)
  1903   – Voldemar Väli, Estonian wrestler (d. 1997)
1904 – Ray Bolger, American actor and dancer (d. 1987)
1907 – Gordon Kidd Teal, American engineer and inventor (d. 2003)
1908 – Paul Henreid, Italian-American actor and director (d. 1992)
1910 – Jean Martinon, French conductor and composer (d. 1976)
1911 – Binod Bihari Chowdhury, Bangladeshi activist (d. 2013)
  1911   – Norman Heatley, English biologist and chemist (d. 2004)
1912   – Della H. Raney, American Army Air Corps officer (d. 1987)
1913 – Gustáv Husák, Slovak politician, 9th President of Czechoslovakia (d. 1991)
  1913   – Mehmet Shehu, Albanian soldier and politician, 22nd Prime Minister of Albania (d. 1981)
1914 – Yu Kuo-hwa, Chinese politician, 23rd Premier of the Republic of China (d. 2000)
1915 – Dean Dixon, American-Swiss conductor (d. 1976)
  1915   – Cynthia Freeman, American author (d. 1988)
1916 – Sune Bergström, Swedish biochemist and academic, Nobel Prize laureate (d. 2004)
  1916   – Eldzier Cortor, American painter (d. 2015)
  1916   – Don Metz, Canadian ice hockey player (d. 2007)
1917 – Jerry Wexler, American journalist and producer (d. 2008)
1918 – Les Bennett, English footballer and manager (d. 1999)
  1918   – Arthur Chung, Guyanese lawyer and politician, 1st President of Guyana (d. 2008)
1919 – Terukuni Manzō, Japanese sumo wrestler, the 38th Yokozuna (d. 1977)
  1919   – Milton Parker, American businessman, co-founded the Carnegie Deli (d. 2009)
1920 – Rosella Hightower, American ballerina (d. 2008)
  1920   – Roberto M. Levingston, Argentinian general and politician, 36th President of Argentina (d. 2015)
1921 – Rodger Ward, American aviator, race car driver and sportscaster (d. 2004)
1922 – Billy Liddell, Scottish-English footballer (d. 2001)
1924 – Earl Bakken, American inventor (d. 2018)
  1924   – Ludmilla Chiriaeff, Canadian ballerina, choreographer, and director (d. 1996)
1925 – Billie Sol Estes, American financier and businessman (d. 2013)
1926 – Musallam Bseiso, Palestinian journalist and politician (d. 2017)
  1927   – Gisele MacKenzie, Canadian-American singer and actress (d. 2003)
  1927   – Johnnie Ray, American singer-songwriter and pianist (d. 1990)
  1927   – Otto Stich, Swiss lawyer and politician, 140th President of the Swiss Confederation (d. 2012)
1928 – Philip Levine, American poet and academic (d. 2015)
  1928   – Peter Mathias, English historian and academic (d. 2016)
1930 – Roy E. Disney, American businessman (d. 2009)
1931 – Peter Barnes, English playwright and screenwriter (d. 2004)
  1931   – Rosalind Howells, Baroness Howells of St Davids, Grenadian-English academic and politician
  1931   – Nik Abdul Aziz Nik Mat, Malaysian cleric and politician, 12th Menteri Besar of Kelantan (d. 2015)
1932 – Lou Henson, American college basketball coach (d. 2020)
1934 – Leonid Kravchuk, Ukrainian politician, 1st President of Ukraine (d. 2022)
1935 – Ronnie Hawkins, American rockabilly singer-songwriter and guitarist (d. 2022).
  1935   – Sherrill Milnes, American opera singer and educator
1936 – Stephen E. Ambrose, American historian and author (d. 2002)
  1936   – Robert Woodrow Wilson, American physicist and astronomer, Nobel Prize laureate
1938 – Elza Ibrahimova, Azerbaijani composer (d. 2012)
  1938   – Donald Knuth, American computer scientist and mathematician
  1938   – Frank Mahovlich, Canadian ice hockey player and politician
  1938   – Willie McCovey, American baseball player (d. 2018)
1939 – Scott McKenzie, American singer-songwriter and guitarist (d. 2012)
  1939   – Sal Mineo, American actor (d. 1976)
1940 – K. J. Yesudas, Indian singer and music director
  1940   – Godfrey Hewitt, English geneticist and academic (d. 2013)
1941 – Tom Clarke, Scottish politician, Shadow Secretary of State for Scotland
1942 – Graeme Gahan, Australian footballer and coach (d. 2018)
1943 – Jim Croce, American singer-songwriter (d. 1973)
1944 – Jeffrey Catherine Jones, American comics and fantasy artist (d. 2011)
  1944   – William Sanderson, American actor
  1944   – Frank Sinatra, Jr., American singer and actor (d. 2016)
1945 – John Fahey, New Zealand-Australian lawyer and politician, 38th Premier of New South Wales (d. 2020)
  1945   – Rod Stewart, British singer-songwriter
  1945   – Gunther von Hagens, German anatomist, invented plastination
1947 – George Alec Effinger, American author (d. 2002)
  1947   – James Morris, American opera singer
  1947   – Peer Steinbrück, German politician, German Minister of Finance
  1947   – Tiit Vähi, Estonian engineer and politician, 11th Prime Minister of Estonia
1948 – Remu Aaltonen, Finnish musician
  1948   – Donald Fagen, American singer-songwriter and musician
  1948   – Bernard Thévenet, French cyclist and sportscaster
1949 – Kemal Derviş, Turkish economist and politician, Turkish Minister of Economy
  1949   – George Foreman, American boxer, actor, and businessman
  1949   – Linda Lovelace, American porn actress and activist (d. 2002)
1953 – Pat Benatar, American singer-songwriter
  1953   – Bobby Rahal, American race car driver
1954 – Baba Vaziroglu, Azerbaijani writer, poet and translator
1956 – Shawn Colvin, American singer-songwriter and guitarist
  1956   – Antonio Muñoz Molina, Spanish author
1959 – Chandra Cheeseborough, American sprinter and coach
  1959   – Chris Van Hollen, American lawyer and politician
  1959   – Fran Walsh, New Zealand screenwriter and producer
1960 – Gurinder Chadha, Kenyan-English director, producer, and screenwriter
  1960   – Brian Cowen, Irish lawyer and politician, 12th Taoiseach of Ireland
  1960   – Benoît Pelletier, Canadian lawyer and politician
1961 – Nadja Salerno-Sonnenberg, Italian-American violinist, author, and educator
1962 – Michael Fortier, Canadian lawyer and politician
  1962   – Kathryn S. McKinley, American computer scientist and academic
1963 – Malcolm Dunford, New Zealand-Australian footballer
  1963   – Kira Ivanova, Russian figure skater (d. 2001)
1964 – Brad Roberts, Canadian singer-songwriter and guitarist
1967 – Maciej Śliwowski, Polish footballer
1969 – Simone Bagel-Trah, German businessperson
1970 – Alisa Marić, Serbian chess player and politician, Serbian Minister of Youth and Sports
1972 – Mohammed Benzakour, Moroccan-Dutch journalist, poet, and author
1973 – Félix Trinidad, Puerto Rican-American boxer
1974 – Jemaine Clement, New Zealand comedian, actor, and musician
  1974   – Davide Dionigi, Italian footballer and manager
  1974   – Steve Marlet, French footballer and coach
  1974   – Bob Peeters, Belgian footballer and manager
  1974   – Hrithik Roshan, Indian actor
1976 – Ian Poulter, English golfer
1978 – Johan van der Wath, South African cricketer
1979 – Simone Cavalli, Italian footballer
1980 – Sarah Shahi, American actress
1981 – Jared Kushner, American real estate investor and political figure
1982 – Julien Brellier, French footballer
  1982   – Tomasz Brzyski, Polish footballer
1984 – Marouane Chamakh, Moroccan footballer
  1984   – Ariane Friedrich, German high jumper
  1984   – Kalki Koechlin, Indian actress
1986 – Kirsten Flipkens, Belgian tennis player
1987 – César Cielo, Brazilian swimmer
1988 – Leonard Patrick Komon, Kenyan runner
1990 – Ishiura Shikanosuke, Japanese sumo wrestler
  1990   – Cody Walker, Australian rugby league player
1991 – Chad Townsend, Australian rugby league player
1996 – Matthew Dufty, Australian rugby league player
  1996   – Dylan Edwards, Australian rugby league player
1997 – Patrick Herbert, New Zealand rugby league player
  1997   – Blake Lawrie, Australian rugby league player

Deaths

Pre-1600
 259 – Polyeuctus, Roman saint
 314 – Miltiades, pope of the Catholic Church
 681 – Agatho, pope of the Catholic Church
 976 – John I Tzimiskes, Byzantine emperor (b. 925)
 987 – Pietro I Orseolo, doge of Venice (b. 928)
1055 – Bretislav I, duke of Bohemia
1094 – Al-Mustansir Billah, Egyptian caliph (b. 1029)
1218 – Hugh I, king of Cyprus
1276 – Gregory X, pope of the Catholic Church (b. c.1210)
1322 – Petrus Aureolus, scholastic philosopher
1358 – Abu Inan Faris, Marinid ruler of Morocco (b. 1329)
1552 – Johann Cochlaeus, German humanist and controversialist (b. 1479)

1601–1900
1645 – William Laud, English archbishop and academic (b. 1573)
1654 – Nicholas Culpeper, English botanist, physician, and astrologer (b. 1616)
1698 – Louis-Sébastien Le Nain de Tillemont, French priest and historian (b. 1637)
1754 – Edward Cave, English publisher, founded The Gentleman's Magazine (b. 1691)
1761 – Edward Boscawen, English admiral and politician (b. 1711)
1778 – Carl Linnaeus, Swedish botanist and physician (b. 1707)
1794 – Georg Forster, German-Polish ethnologist and journalist (b. 1754)
1811 – Joseph Chénier, French poet, playwright, and politician (b. 1764)
1824 – Victor Emmanuel I, duke of Savoy and king of Sardinia (b. 1759)
1828 – François de Neufchâteau, French poet, academic, and politician, French Minister of the Interior (b. 1750)
1829 – Gregorio Funes, Argentinian clergyman, historian, and educator (b. 1749)
1843 – Dimitrie Macedonski, Greek-Romanian captain and politician (b. 1780)
1851 – Karl Freiherr von Müffling, Prussian field marshal (b. 1775)
1855 – Mary Russell Mitford, English author and playwright (b. 1787)
1862 – Samuel Colt, American engineer and businessman, founded Colt's Manufacturing Company (b. 1814)
1863 – Lyman Beecher, American minister and activist, co-founded the American Temperance Society (b. 1775)
1895 – Benjamin Godard, French violinist and composer (b. 1849)

1901–present
1901 – James Dickson, English-Australian businessman and politician, 1st Australian Minister for Defence (b. 1832)
1904 – Jean-Léon Gérôme, French painter and sculptor (b. 1824)
1905 – Kārlis Baumanis, Latvian composer (b. 1835)
1917 – Buffalo Bill, American soldier and hunter (b. 1846)
  1917   – Feliks Leparsky, Russian fencer and captain (b. 1875)
1920 – Sali Nivica, Albanian journalist and politician (b. 1890)
1922 – Frank Tudor, Australian politician, 6th Australian Minister for Trade and Investment (b. 1866)
1926 – Eino Leino, Finnish poet and journalist (b. 1878)
1935 – Edwin Flack, Australian tennis player and runner (b. 1873)
  1935   – Charlie McGahey, English cricketer and footballer (b. 1871)
1941 – Frank Bridge, English viola player and composer (b. 1879)
  1941   – John Lavery, Irish painter and academic (b. 1856)
  1941   – Issai Schur, Belarusian-German mathematician and academic (b. 1875)
1949 – Erich von Drygalski, German geographer and geophysicist (b. 1865)
1951 – Sinclair Lewis, American novelist, short-story writer, and playwright, Nobel Prize laureate (b. 1885)
  1951   – Yoshio Nishina, Japanese physicist and academic (b. 1890)
1954 – Chester Wilmot, American journalist and historian (b. 1911)
1956 – Zonia Baber, American geographer and geologist (b. 1862)
1957 – Gabriela Mistral, Chilean poet and academic, Nobel Prize laureate (b. 1889)
1959 – Şükrü Kaya, Turkish jurist and politician, Turkish Minister of Foreign Affairs (b. 1883)
1960 – Jack Laviolette, Canadian ice hockey player, coach, and manager (b. 1879)
1961 – Dashiell Hammett, American detective novelist and screenwriter (b. 1894)
1967 – Charles E. Burchfield, American painter (b. 1893)
1968 – Ali Fuat Cebesoy, Turkish general and politician, 6th Speaker of the Parliament of Turkey (b. 1882)
1969 – Sampurnanand, Indian educator and politician, 2nd Governor of Rajasthan (b. 1891)
1970 – Pavel Belyayev, Russian pilot and astronaut (b. 1925)
1971 – Coco Chanel, French fashion designer, founded Chanel (b. 1883)
  1971   – Ignazio Giunti, Italian racing driver (b. 1941)
1972 – Aksel Larsen, Danish lawyer and politician (b. 1897)
1976 – Howlin' Wolf, American singer-songwriter and guitarist (b. 1910)
1978 – Pedro Joaquín Chamorro Cardenal, Nicaraguan journalist and author (b. 1924)
  1978   – Don Gillis, American composer and conductor (b. 1912)
  1978   – Hannah Gluckstein, British painter (b. 1895)
1981 – Fawn M. Brodie, American historian and author (b. 1915)
1984 – Souvanna Phouma, Laotian politician, 8th Prime Minister of Laos (b. 1901)
1986 – Jaroslav Seifert, Czech journalist and poet, Nobel Prize laureate (b. 1901)
1987 – Marion Hutton, American singer (b. 1919)
  1987   – David Robinson, English businessman and philanthropist (b. 1904)
1989 – Herbert Morrison, American journalist and producer (b. 1905)
1990 – Tochinishiki Kiyotaka, Japanese sumo wrestler, the 44th Yokozuna (b. 1925)
1992 – Roberto Bonomi, Argentinian racing driver (b. 1919)
1995 – Kathleen Tynan, Canadian-English journalist, author, and screenwriter (b. 1937)
1997 – Elspeth Huxley, Kenyan-English journalist and author (b. 1907)
  1997   – Sheldon Leonard, American actor, director, and producer (b. 1907)
  1997   – Alexander R. Todd, Baron Todd, Scottish biochemist and academic, Nobel Prize laureate (b. 1907)
1999 – Edward Williams, Australian lieutenant, pilot, and judge (b. 1921)
2000 – Sam Jaffe, American screenwriter and producer (b. 1901)
2004 – Spalding Gray, American actor and screenwriter (b. 1941)
2005 – Wasyly, Ukrainian-Canadian bishop (b. 1909)
  2005   – Jack Horner, American journalist (b. 1912)
  2005   – Princess Joséphine Charlotte of Belgium (b. 1927)
2007 – Carlo Ponti, Italian film producer (b. 1912)
  2007   – Bradford Washburn, American explorer, photographer, and cartographer (b. 1910)
2008 – Christopher Bowman, American figure skater and actor (b. 1967)
  2008   – Maila Nurmi, Finnish-American actress, producer, and screenwriter (b. 1922)
2010 – Patcha Ramachandra Rao, Indian metallurgist, educator and administrator (b. 1942)
2011 – Margaret Whiting, American singer (b. 1924)
2012 – Jean Pigott, Canadian businesswoman and politician (b. 1924)
  2012   – Gevork Vartanian, Russian intelligence agent (b. 1924)
2013 – George Gruntz, Swiss pianist and composer (b. 1932)
  2013   – Claude Nobs, Swiss businessman, founded the Montreux Jazz Festival (b. 1936)
2014 – Sam Berns, American activist (b. 1996)
  2014   – Petr Hlaváček, Czech shoemaker and academic (b. 1950)
  2014   – Zbigniew Messner, Polish economist and politician, 9th Prime Minister of the Republic of Poland (b. 1929)
  2014   – Larry Speakes, American journalist, 16th White House Press Secretary (b. 1939)
  2014   – Dajikaka Gadgil, Indian jeweller (b. 1915)
2015 – Junior Malanda, Belgian footballer (b. 1994)
  2015   – Taylor Negron, American actor, playwright, and painter (b. 1957)
  2015   – Francesco Rosi, Italian director and screenwriter (b. 1922)
  2015   – Robert Stone, American novelist and short story writer (b. 1937)
2016 – David Bowie, English singer-songwriter, producer, and actor (b. 1947)
  2016   – George Jonas, Hungarian-Canadian journalist, author, and poet (b. 1935)
2017 – Buddy Greco, American jazz and pop singer and pianist (b. 1926)
  2017   – Clare Hollingworth, English journalist (b. 1911)
2020 – Qaboos bin Said, ruler of Oman (b. 1940)
2022 – Joyce Eliason, American television personality (b. 1934)
2022 – Robert Durst, American real estate heir and convicted murderer (b. 1943)
2023 – Jeff Beck, English guitarist and songwriter (b. 1944)
2023 – Constantine II of Greece, King of Greece (1964-1973) (b. 1940)

Holidays and observances
 Christian feast day:
 Behnam, Sarah, and the Forty Martyrs (Armenian Apostolic Church)
 Gregory of Nyssa
 Leonie Aviat
 Obadiah (Coptic Church)
 Peter Orseolo
 Pope Agatho (Roman Catholic)
 William Laud (Anglican Communion)
 William of Donjeon
 January 10 (Eastern Orthodox liturgics)
 Fête du Vodoun (Benin)
 Margaret Thatcher Day (Falkland Islands)
 Majority Rule Day (Bahamas)

References

External links

 BBC: On This Day
 
 Historical Events on January 10

Days of the year
January